The 2011 Worthing Borough Council election took place on 5 May 2011 to elect members of Worthing Borough Council in West Sussex, England. One third of the council was up for election, with the exception of the two member wards of Durrington and Northbrook. The Conservative Party retained overall control of the council.

After the election, the composition of the council was:
Conservative: 25
Liberal Democrat: 11
Independent: 1

Election result

Ward results

References

2011 English local elections
2011
2010s in West Sussex